The Stratton House is a 1.5-story Vernacular Craftsman bungalow built in 1911 in Eugene, Oregon. Vernacular architecture is a designation that indicates local or folk use of style and materials. The house was designed and constructed by Louis H. E. Stratton for Sarah Patterson, a rental property owner. Patterson rented the house to Stratton until 1920, when records show he became the owner.

The house was listed on the National Register of Historic Places in 1992.

See also
 National Register of Historic Places listings in Lane County, Oregon

References

External links
 Lane County historical Society

1911 establishments in Oregon
Houses completed in 1911
Houses on the National Register of Historic Places in Eugene, Oregon
Bungalow architecture in Oregon